Paul Étienne Victor Wachs (19 September 1851 – 6 July 1915) was a French composer, organist and pianist. He is most remembered for his salon compositions for piano.

Biography
Born in Paris, Wachs was the son of the French composer Frédéric Wachs (1825–1899). He was a student at the Conservatoire de Paris, where his teachers included François Benoist and César Franck for organ and Victor Massé and Antoine François Marmontel for composition.

After his studies, he became the second organist at the Church of Saint-Sulpice. In 1874, he left this position to be the choirmaster at the Church of Saint-Merri. This position had previously been held by Camille Saint-Saëns. He held this position until 1896. In 1908, Wachs bought a large property in Saint-Mandé, which he named Les Myrtles after one of his compositions. He lived there with his family until his death at age 63.

Among his works for piano, the most famous is Promenade à Âne.

List of compositions
Alphabetical list based on IMSLP.

 Angélus
 Au matin
 Baliverne
 Les Blés sont mûrs
 Boléro
 Brin de paille
 Capricante
 Carillonnettes
 Chanson du rouet
 Cœur léger
 Deux Pièces pour orgue
 Dormez, Ninon!
 Douce gaîté
 Doux aveu
 Hosanna
 Le Joyeux rémouleur
 Le Kangourou
 Madrileña
 Marche triomphale
 Les Myrtes
 Le Pas des bouquetières
 Rose et papillon
 Te Deum
 Une Noce au village
 Valse interrompue
 Valse parisienne

References

External links
 
 Paul Wachs's sheet music at  IMSLP

1851 births
1915 deaths
19th-century classical composers
Conservatoire de Paris alumni
French classical organists
French male classical composers
French male organists
French Romantic composers
Musicians from Paris
Pupils of Antoine François Marmontel
19th-century French male musicians
20th-century French male musicians
Male classical organists